David A. Bositis is an American expert on voting rights and redistricting. He is a former a senior research associate at the Joint Center for Political and Economic Studies in Washington, D.C.

Bositis is frequently consulted by major newspapers, including The New York Times and The Washington Post for his input on issues of race in politics.

Bositis received his bachelor's degree from Northwestern University, and a master's degree and doctorate from Southern Illinois University. Bositis joined the Joint Center in 1990, and designs and manages national surveys, mainly geared towards minorities.

Bositis is the author of at least six books and numerous articles which focus on minority politics, especially black representation and voting patterns and the effects of redistricting on minority representation.

Publications

References

External links
Joint Center for Political and Economic Studies
An Interview with David Bositis - Religion and Social Policy.org

American political scientists
Year of birth missing (living people)
Living people
Place of birth missing (living people)